Thomas Tate may refer to:
Thomas Tate (boxer) (born 1965), American boxer
Thomas Tate (mathematician) (1807–1888), English mathematical and scientific educator and writer
Thomas L. Tate, American politician in Virginia
Thomas Tate (mayor), mayor of Birmingham, Alabama, 1872
Tommy Tate (born 1956), American football coach
Tommy Tate (musician) (1945–2017), American soul singer and songwriter
Tom Tate (born 1959), mayor of Gold Coast, Australia

See also
Thomas Tait (disambiguation)
Thomas Tate Tobin (1823–1904), American adventurer